Shalimar (Hindi : शालीमार) is a 1978 Bollywood film, written and directed by Krishna Shah. The movie starred Dharmendra, Zeenat Aman, Shammi Kapoor, Prem Nath and Aruna Irani. English actor Rex Harrison and American actors John Saxon and Sylvia Miles appear in supporting roles in their first and only Bollywood film. Jayamalini does a dance number in the film. This was the last time that Mohammed Rafi's voice was picturized on Shammi Kapoor. Its English version is known as Raiders of the Sacred Stone. Rex Harrison's voice was dubbed by Kader Khan. The plot is inspired by the novel The Vulture is a Patient Bird by James Hadley Chase, The film's script was novelized by Manohar Malagaonkar

Plot

On the run from the police, S.S. Kumar (Dharmendra), a thief, comes across a private invitation to the island of Sir John Locksley (Rex Harrison) addressed to Raja Bahadur Singh. When the Raja is shot, Kumar takes him to a nearby hospital, dons a Sikh's turban, poses as the Raja's son and goes to the private island of Sir John. Also attending are K.P.W. Iyengar aka Romeo, Dr. Dubari, Colonel Columbus, and Countess Sylvia Rasmussen. A stunned Kumar finds out that all of these invitees are master criminals and thieves. Kumar's guise does not fool anyone, including his former sweetheart, Sheila Enders (Zeenat Aman), nevertheless Sir John permits him to stay on, as he feels that Kumar's career, though an amateur, is consistent with those already present. The reason why John has invited them is to find a successor to take his place as he is dying of cancer. He feels that one of his invitees can be trusted to take his place and for this he has arranged for them to steal a Diamond Shalimar worth 135 crores of rupees. This gem is placed in a secure room within his palace, which is alarmed, and guarded by armed men 24 hours a day. The ruby itself is located within a display case of bulletproof glass and surrounded by a minefield. He challenges one of them to steal the shalimar - but if anyone fails then they are killed by the security system. Columbus, Rasmussen, Dr Dubari perish while trying to steal Shalimar. Romeo revokes his name from the competition, but he is killed by Sir John. Sir John who has become insecure after claiming Shalimar that these veteran criminals may try to rob it, hence he plays a handicapped and cancer card so that these criminals are killed  during competition. Kumar then attempts and he succeeds, the Local tribe leaders kill Sir John as he had promised Shalimar to them. Later its shown that Kumar is actual an army personal on his special mission from CBI, to arrest the master criminals.

Box office

The film was released in two versions; Hindi and dubbed in English for the USA release. Both were unsuccessful when they were released. However the Hindi version later gained cult status in the DVD-Video circuit, and is now seen as ahead of its times.

Cast

Dharmendra as S.S. Kumar 
Zeenat Aman as Sheila Enders
Rex Harrison as Sir John Locksley
John Saxon as Colonel Columbus 
Sylvia Miles as Countess Rasmussen 
O. P. Ralhan as K.P.W. Iyengar (Romeo) 
Shammi Kapoor as Dr. Dubari
Prem Nath as Raja Bahadur Singh 
Shreeram Lagoo as Tolaram 
Aruna Irani as Dance Teacher 
Clyde Chai-Fa as Dogro 
M. B. Shetty as Tribal Chief
Jayamalini as tribal dancer

Soundtrack
The music of this movie was given by the legendary music composer R. D. Burman while Anand Bakshi penned the lyrics. "Hum Bewafaa Hargiz Na The"  sung by Kishore Kumar is an evergreen song of this album.

The soundtrack was featured in the book, 1001 Albums You Must Hear Before You Die.

Awards

 26th Filmfare Awards:

Nominated

 Best Music Director – R. D. Burman
 Best Male Playback Singer – Kishore Kumar for "Hum Bewafaa"
 Best Female Playback Singer – Usha Uthup for "One Two Cha Cha Cha"

References

External links
 

1970s Hindi-language films
1978 films
Indian adventure films
Films scored by R. D. Burman
American adventure films
English-language Indian films
Indian multilingual films
American multilingual films
1978 multilingual films
1970s American films
Hindi-language adventure films
English-language adventure films